For an overview of Geology see Outline of geology.
 For dating techniques based on Geology see Relative dating.
 For the 1830s book by Charles Lyell, see Principles of Geology.